Choriantha is a genus of flowering plants belonging to the family Boraginaceae.

Its native range is Iraq.

Species:
 Choriantha popoviana Riedl

References

Boraginaceae
Boraginaceae genera